Government College Ikorodu (GCI) is a college founded 21st September, 1974, in Ikorodu Local Government Area, Lagos State, Nigeria.

History
Government College Ikorodu was established in September 1974 as a co-educational secondary school with an initial intake of about 200 pioneer students. These students were transferred from other secondary schools in Lagos state from where they were seconded based on the common entrance examination applications that year. In the first year of the school, it occupied a temporary site on Obafemi Awolowo Way, Ikorodu (then referred to as Agbowa Road). The principal was Olatunde Balogun whose disciplinary disposition has contributed to a great deal in shaping the lives of those in the school. 

The college was opened on September 23, 1974, by the then Governor of Lagos state, Brigadier Mobolaji Johnson. 

GCI achieved much in its first five years and was among the five colleges Chief Adeniran Ogunsanya awarded scholarships to when he was commissioner for education in 1975.

Membership in the Government College Ikorodu old student association is open to all who attended for at least one academic year.

Notable alumni

Clarence Peters, videographer, CEO Capital hill record label
Olusegun Mayor-Olabiyitan , An Architect, Founder of OFC Designs and Current Director of Ogunlade Foundations and Co. General Secretary GCIOSA twice

References

External links
 http://www.gciikorodu.com

Secondary schools in Lagos State
1974 establishments in Nigeria
Educational institutions established in 1974
Ikorodu